LoliRock is a French animated television series produced by Marathon Media and the Zodiak Kids. It was created by Jean Louis-Vandestoc and written by Madellaine Paxson. It first aired in France on 18 October 2014 on France 3, and has expanded to television channels in Europe. It has also been licensed worldwide, with an English dub released to Netflix on 1 May 2016. The LoliRock producers released the four episodes of season 2 on YouTube in December 2016.  Netflix has released the English dub of the season 2 episodes on 5 January 2017. The second season was broadcast on France 4 in February with two episodes per weekday. Unfortunately, the series was cancelled after the two-part season two finale "Crowning Glory".

Series overview

Episode list

Season 1
Most episodes are self-contained and can be viewed in any order, save for certain episodes that would fit the progression: "To Find a Princess" (Ep. 1), "Xeris" (Ep. 6), "Shanila Surprise" (Ep. 19) and the final two episodes (Ep. 25 and 26). The in-story time between episodes was estimated to be from a few days to one or two weeks. The fifth episode "Sing for Me" was originally broadcast as the second episode, and viewers expressed concern that Iris had learned her magic too quickly after the first episode.

All episodes were directed by Jean Louis-Vandestoc unless noted. 13 episodes were broadcast in 2014–15 on France 3, and 13 new episodes were broadcast in 2016 on France 4.

Season 2
The LoliRock production team released four of the season 2 episodes on YouTube in French as a special Christmas preview.  The English version of the episodes were released on Netflix on 5 January 2017. The episodes were broadcast on France 4 starting 13 February, running two episodes per weekday; the series was ultimately cancelled after the two-part finale, much to the disappointment of fans.

References

Lists of French animated television series episodes
Lists of children's television series episodes